Sophia Ann Bates (6 March 1817–28 November 1899) was a New Zealand teacher and postmistress. She was born in London, London, England on 6 March 1817.

References

1817 births
1899 deaths
New Zealand educators
English emigrants to New Zealand
19th-century New Zealand people